Present Arms is the second album by UB40 and was released in 1981. It spent 38 weeks on the UK album charts, reaching number 2. An album of original songs, it spawned two top 20 hits in "One in Ten" (number 7) and "Don't Let It Pass You By/Don't Slow Down" (16).

Like their first album Signing Off, Present Arms contained many socially and politically charged lyrics, from the anti-military title track to "Sardonicus" which was linked to both President Ronald Reagan and risus sardonicus, an ironic smile on tetanus victims' faces, The UK top-ten hit "One in Ten" was an attack on Thatcherism. The album also touches on a subject very dear to UB40's heart: 'Lamb's Bread' and 'Don't Walk On The Grass' are written as part of the band's longstanding campaign for the legalisation of cannabis. Musically, the album continued in the heavy, reverb-drenched, mellifluous style of the debut.

The title track has been used to open UB40 concerts from the mid 1990s onwards, usually with the blasting horn section beginning the concert.

As with Signing Off, Present Arms was critically acclaimed and commercially successful in the UK.

A dub version of this album called Present Arms in Dub was released soon after.

Track listing LP
All tracks composed by UB40

Disc One (album)
Side 1
"Present Arms" – 4:08
"Sardonicus" – 4:29
"Don't Let It Pass You By" – 7:45
"Wildcat" – 3:04
Side 2
"One in Ten" – 4:32
"Don't Slow Down" – 4:28
"Silent Witness" – 4:15
"Lamb's Bread" – 4:48

Disc Two (EP)
With the original 1981 release was a 12" single (7" single in some countries) containing two instrumental tracks. These were added to the CD album.

"Don't Walk on the Grass" – 5:20
"Dr X" – 5:07

Track listing CD

"Present Arms" – 4:08
"Sardonicus" – 4:29
"Don't Let It Pass You By" – 7:45
"Wildcat" – 3:04
"One in Ten" – 4:32
"Don't Slow Down" – 4:28
"Silent Witness" – 4:15
"Lamb's Bread" – 4:48
"Dr X" – 5:07
"Don't Walk on the Grass" – 5:20

Most if not all CD iterations of the album (including the 2014 Deluxe Edition) have the titles of "Don't Walk on the Grass" and "Dr. X" transposed; "Dr. X" is the shorter of the two tracks, and begins with a count-in.

Personnel 
UB40
 Astro – trumpet, vocals, toasting
 Jimmy Brown – drums, vocals
 Ali Campbell – vocals, guitar
 Robin Campbell – vocals, guitar
 Earl Falconer – bass guitar
 Norman Hassan – electronic drums, percussion, trombone
 Brian Travers – saxophone
 Michael Virtue – keyboards
with:
Neil Black - violin on "Dr. X"

Production
 Ray "Pablo" Falconer – producer
Pete Wandless - engineer
Neil Black - assistant engineer

Certifications

References

External links
Official site

UB40 albums
1981 albums